Thomas Hitton (died February 1530) is generally considered to be the first English Protestant martyr of the Reformation, although the followers of Wycliffe - the Lollards - had been burned at the stake as early as 1519.

Hitton was a priest who had joined William Tyndale and the English exiles in the Low Countries. He returned to England on a brief visit in 1529 to contact the supporters of Tyndale and to arrange for the distribution of smuggled books such as the first English Psalter translated by George Joye. He was seized near Gravesend on his way to the coast to take a ship, and found to be in possession of letters from the English exiles. He was then arrested on the grounds of heresy, interrogated and probably tortured. He was condemned by Archbishop William Warham and by Bishop John Fisher and burned at the stake at Maidstone on 23 February 1530. When Joye's second Primer (entitled Hortulus animae) appeared a year later, he included the feast of "Sainte Thomas mar." (referring to Hitton) in the calendar. 
Tyndale also referred briefly to Hitton's execution: 

Thomas More described Hitton as "the devil's stinking martyr" and took a personal interest in the case. Thomas More burnt six heretics in the two years he was Lord Chancellor, the subject being the first in February 1530.  He criticized George Joye for canonizing Hitton: 

Hitton believed in the supremacy of the Scriptures. He also argued that, whilst baptism was necessary and marriage was good, neither had to be done by a priest or in a church, and that baptism "would be much better if it were spoken in English".

See also

 William Tyndale
 Thomas More
 John Fisher
 English Reformation

Notes

English Reformation
16th-century English clergy
People executed for heresy
1530 deaths
Executed British people
Executed English people
16th-century Protestant martyrs
People executed under Henry VIII
Year of birth missing
People executed by the Kingdom of England by burning
Protestant martyrs of England
English Christian clergy